Dunsmuir Municipal-Mott Airport  is three miles north of Dunsmuir, in Siskiyou County, California. It was built as an auxiliary airfield on the San Francisco - Seattle airway.

Facilities
Its one runway, 14/32, is 2,700 by 60 ft (823 x 18 m) asphalt.

In 2007 the airport had 500 aircraft operations, average 41 per month, all general aviation. 20 aircraft were then based at the airport, all single-engine.

References

External links 

Mount Shasta
Airports in Siskiyou County, California